Janio is a given name. It may refer to:

 Jânio Quadros (1917-1992), 22nd President of Brazil
 Janio Posito (born 1989), Peruvian football forward
 Jânio (footballer) (born 1991), Jânio Daniel do Nascimento Santos, Brazilian football forward
 Janio Bikel (born 1995), Portuguese football defensive midfielder